This is a chronological summary of the major events of the 2022 Winter Olympics in Beijing and venues near neighboring towns of Yanqing and Chongli in the People's Republic of China. Competition began on 2 February with the first matches in the group stages of the curling events. The opening ceremony was held two days later on 4 February. The last day of competition and the closing ceremony were on 20 February.

The games featured 109 events in 7 different sports, encompassing a total of 15 disciplines. New events included men's and women's big air freestyle skiing, women's monobob, mixed team competitions in freestyle skiing aerials, ski jumping, and snowboard cross, and the mixed relay in short track speed skating.

About 91 National Olympic Committees qualified athletes, with Haiti and Saudi Arabia each making their Winter Olympics debuts. As a result of the 2020 ruling by the Court of Arbitration for Sport on the Russian doping scandal, Russian athletes competed in both the 2020 Summer Olympics and the 2022 Winter Olympics under the acronym "ROC" after the name of the Russian Olympic Committee, and under the flag of the Russian Olympic Committee.

Calendar

Medal table

Day-by-day summaries

Day (−2) — Wednesday 2 February
Curling
 The first matches in the round-robin stage of the mixed doubles tournament.

Day (−1) — Thursday 3 February
Curling
 Second day of the round-robin stage of the mixed doubles tournament.

Freestyle skiing
 The first day of competition in both the men's moguls and the women's moguls.

Ice hockey
 The first matches in the group stage of the women's tournament.

Day 0 — Friday 4 February
Curling
 Third day of the round-robin stage of the mixed doubles tournament.

Figure skating
 The first day of competition in the team event.

Ice hockey
 Second day of the group stage of the women's tournament.

Opening ceremony
 The opening ceremony was held at Beijing National Stadium.

Day 1 — Saturday 5 February
Curling
 Fourth day of the round robin stage of the mixed doubles tournament.

Ice hockey
 Third day of the group stage of the women's tournament.

Luge
 Heats 1 and 2 of the men's singles.

Short track speed skating
 The first day of competition in both the men's 1000 metres and the women's 500 metres.

Ski jumping
 The first day of competition in the men's normal hill individual.

Snowboarding
 The first day of competition in the women's slopestyle.

Day 2 — Sunday 6 February
Alpine skiing
 The men's downhill is postponed to the following day due to high winds.

Curling
 Fifth day of the round-robin stage of the mixed doubles tournament.

Figure skating
 The second day of competition in the team event.

Ice hockey
 Fourth day of the group stage of the women's tournament.

Snowboarding
 The first day of competition in the men's slopestyle.

Day 3 — Monday 7 February
Curling
 Final day of the round-robin stage and Semifinals of the mixed doubles tournament.

Freestyle skiing
 The first day of competition in both the men's big air and the women's big air.

Ice hockey
 Fifth day of the group stage of the women's tournament.

Luge
 Heats 1 and 2 of the women's singles.

Short track speed skating
 After several skaters in the men's 1000m receive penalty or yellow card decisions, Korea and Hungary file protests against those specific decisions that were handed to Hwang Dae-heon and Shaolin Sándor Liu, respectively. Because Ren Ziwei and Li Wenlong of China finish with gold and silver, respectively, and no other skater from the host country was penalized, other athletes accuse the officiating of bias. The International Skating Union (ISU) later rejects both protests, supporting the original decisions.

Day 4 — Tuesday 8 February
Figure skating
 Short program for the men's singles.

Ice hockey
 Final day of the group stage of the women's tournament.

Day 5 — Wednesday 9 February
Curling
 The first matches in the round-robin stage of the men's tournament.

Ice hockey
 The first matches in the group stage of the men's tournament.

Snowboarding
 The first day of competition in both the women's halfpipe and the men's halfpipe.

Day 6 — Thursday 10 February
Curling
 Second day of the round-robin stage of the men's tournament.
 The first matches in the round-robin stage of the women's tournament.

Ice hockey
 Second day of the group stage of the wen's tournament.

Skeleton
 Runs 1 and 2 of the Men's.

Day 7 — Friday 11 February
Curling
 Third day of the round-robin stage of the men's tournament.
 Second day of the round-robin stage of the women's tournament.

Ice hockey
 Third day of the group stage of the men's tournament.
 Quarterfinals of the women's tournament.

Skeleton
 Runs 1 and 2 of the Women's.

Day 8 — Saturday 12 February
Curling
 Fourth day of the round-robin stage of the men's tournament.
 Third day of the round-robin stage of the women's tournament.

Figure skating
 Rhythm dance for the ice dance.

Ice hockey
 Fourth day of the group stage of the men's tournament.
 Quarterfinals of the women's tournament.

Day 9 — Sunday 13 February
Bobsleigh
 Heats 1 and 2 of the women's monobob.

Curling
 Fifth day of the round-robin stage of the men's tournament.
 Fourth day of the round-robin stage of the women's tournament.

Freestyle skiing
 The first day of competition in both the women's aerials and the women's slopestyle is postponed to the following day due to high winds and heavy snow.

Ice hockey
 Last day of the group stage of the Men's tournament.

Day 10 — Monday 14 February
Bobsleigh
 Heats 1 and 2 of the Two-man.

Curling
 Sixth day of the round-robin stage of the men's tournament.
 Fifth day of the round-robin stage of the women's tournament.

Freestyle skiing
 The first day of competition of the women's aerials (rescheduled from the previous day). The originally scheduled final for this event is then held in the evening.
 The first day of competition of the women's slopestyle (rescheduled from the previous day). The originally scheduled final for this event is thus postponed to the next day.
 Due to the rescheduled women's slopestyle event, the first day of competition of the men's slopestyle is postponed to the following day.

Ice hockey
 Semifinals of the Women's tournament.

Snowboarding
 The first day of competition in both the women's big air and the men's big air.

Day 11 — Tuesday 15 February
Curling
 Seventh day of the round-robin stage of the men's tournament.
 Sixth day of the round-robin stage of the women's tournament.

Figure skating
 Short program for the women's singles.

Freestyle skiing
 The first day of competition of the men's aerials.
 The first day of competition of the men's slopestyle (rescheduled from the previous day). The originally scheduled final for this event is thus postponed to the next day.

Ice hockey
 Playoff round of the Men's tournament.

Day 12 — Wednesday 16 February
Curling
 Eighth day of the round-robin stage of the men's tournament.
 Seventh day of the round-robin stage of the women's tournament.

Ice hockey
 Quarterfinals of the men's tournament.
 Bronze medal game of the Women's tournament.

Day 13 — Thursday 17 February
Curling
 Last day of the round-robin stage and Semifinals of the men's tournament.
 Last day of the round-robin stage of the women's tournament.

Freestyle skiing
 The first day of competition for both the women's halfpipe and the men's halfpipe.

Day 14 — Friday 18 February
Bobsleigh
 Heats 1 and 2 of the Two-woman.

Curling
 Bronze medal game of the Men's tournament.
 Semifinals of the Women's tournament.

Figure skating
 Short program for the pair skating.

Ice hockey
 Semifinals of the Men's tournament.

Day 15 — Saturday 19 February
Alpine skiing
 The mixed team event is postponed to the following day due to high winds.

Bobsleigh
 Heats 1 and 2 of the Four-man.

Cross-country skiing
 Due to high winds, the men's 50km freestyle is delayed by an hour and shortened to 30 km.

Curling
 Bronze medal game of the Women's tournament.

Ice hockey
 Bronze medal game of the Men's tournament.

Day 16 — Sunday 20 February
Closing ceremony
 The closing ceremony was held at Beijing National Stadium.

Notes

References

External links 
 Beijing 2022

2022 Winter Olympics
2022